The Leeds Outer Ring Road is a main road that runs around most of the perimeter of the city of Leeds, West Yorkshire, England. The ring road is approximately 29 miles (45 km) and consists of single and dual carriageways.  The road is not a loop and so is not a true ring road, although it is designated as such.

The road begins in Belle Isle and ends in Thorpe Park, Leeds at junction 46 of the M1 motorway. It begins in Belle Isle as an un-numbered road and goes through to Beeston.  It is then designated the A6110 between Beeston and Bramley a dual carriageway, before running concurrently with the Stanningley By-Pass A647 also a dual carriageway but with grade separated junctions.

For the rest of the way between Farsley and Thorpe Park the road is the A6120 and it is a mixture of single and dual carriageway. The ring road ends at Junction 45 of the M1.

Ring Road names 

The road name of the ring road reflects the district it passes through. The table below states the name of the ring road and the number of carriageways in each district.

As A6110

 A643 road Ring Road Beeston / Elland Road There is a brief concurrency where the A6110 and A643 run together as 40mph dual carriageway for about 1/2 mile.

As Old Ring Road (B6902)

 A64 road and Old Ring Road Seacroft There was a brief concurrency where the old A6120 (now just A64) and A64 used to run together as 70mph dual carriageway for about a half mile.
 A63 road  Selby Road The then former A63 between M1 J46 and Whitkirk Roundabout (Cracked Egg) was redesignated A6120 in 2001. However following the East Leeds Orbital Route (ELOR) plan completed in 2022, the road was reverted back to being the A63.

East Leeds Orbital Route (A6120)
After a protracted planning process, Leeds City Council announced in June 2018 the awarding of contracts for the East Leeds Orbital Route (ELOR) which runs from Thorpe Park (adjacent to junction 46 of the M1) to join the previous ring road near Red Hall, just to the west of its intersection with the A58.

The  route cost approximately £120 million and is a dual carriageway throughout, with roundabouts intersecting with roads in East Leeds. The route was opened on 22 August 2022. The road now forms part of the A6120 and a section of the former ring road is now (January 2023) numbered as the B6902.

References

External links
 A6120 Leeds Outer Ring Road study - Leeds City Council.
 Leeds Outer Ring Road - UK Roads:Leeds

Transport in Leeds
Transport in West Yorkshire
Roads in Leeds
Ring roads in the United Kingdom